Gary Owen Schmalzbauer (born January 27, 1940) is an American former ice hockey forward and Olympian.

Schmalzbauer played with Team USA at the 1964 Winter Olympics held in Innsbruck, Austria. He also played for the Rochester Mustangs in the United States Hockey League.

References

External links

1940 births
Living people
Ice hockey players at the 1964 Winter Olympics
Olympic ice hockey players of the United States
American men's ice hockey left wingers
Minnesota Golden Gophers men's ice hockey players
Ice hockey people from Saint Paul, Minnesota